Cheap Queen is the debut studio album by American pop singer-songwriter King Princess, released on October 25, 2019, through Mark Ronson's imprint of Columbia Records, Zelig Records. A deluxe edition of the album with five additional tracks was released on February 14, 2020. Straus began a tour in support of the album on September 20, 2019.

Background
The album was written chronologically, with Straus stating that she named the album Cheap Queen after the drag term for a queen that is "resourceful, making something out of not very much". While Straus started her career with songs like "1950" and "Pussy Is God", The Guardian remarked that she swaps out those "queer pop anthems for understated ballads". Straus explained that the album's sound came about as she was "dealing with the most vulnerable year of my life" after the popularity of "1950", as she was under "complete stress and anxiety, and not knowing what to do with myself or with my body, and then also being in love".

Straus released a deluxe edition of Cheap Queen on February 14, 2020, which included five new songs.

Critical reception

Cheap Queen received universal acclaim from music critics. On review aggregate site Metacritic the album received a rating of 81 out of 100 from 13 critics, indicating "universal acclaim". The album's sound has been compared to the works of Prince, Morrissey, Richard Hawley, Lily Allen, Madonna, Lorde, James Blake, Robyn, Imogen Heap, Fiona Apple, Billie Eilish, Maggie Rogers, Clairo, and Janis Joplin. Matt Collar of Allmusic praised how Straus examines themes of gender and sexuality "with a low-key sensuality that combines masculine hip-hop confidence with a soulful, feminist point-of-view". Max Gayler of The Line of Best Fit praised the album's "eclectic instrumentation and bold production" and the "one-two punch" of the album's closing two tracks, saying "King Princess hasn't reinvented pop, but she is bridging its most exciting chasms." Aimee Cliff of The Guardian complimented the "funk-driven" "Hit the Back", as well as King Princess's voice, which Cliff described as "often intimately close in the mix, brushing up against your ear, unglamorous and unadorned."

Accolades

Track listing

Personnel

Musicians

King Princess – lead and background vocals (all tracks), songwriting (all tracks), production (all tracks), bass (tracks 1–4, 7–12, 14, 16), programming (tracks 1–10, 13, 14, 16–18), synthesizer (tracks 2, 4, 5, 7, 13, 14, 16), keyboards (tracks 3, 10–12), guitar (tracks 4–7, 10, 11, 14, 18), drums (tracks 9, 11–14)
Mike Malchicoff – production (tracks 1–7, 9–12, 14–17), assistant producer (tracks 8, 13, 18)
Nick Long – songwriting (tracks 1, 3, 4, 6, 7, 9, 11, 14, 16, 17), guitar (tracks 1, 4, 7, 9, 11, 16)
Homer Steinweiss – drums (track 1)
Leon Michels – keyboards (track 1)
Jonah Finegold – guitar (tracks 3, 4, 9, 11, 12, 14, 17, 18)
Michael Freeman – assistant engineer (tracks 3, 4, 9, 13)
Amandla Stenberg – songwriting (track 3)
Billie Holiday – songwriting (track 3)
Carl Sigman – songwriting (track 3)
Bob Russell – songwriting (track 3)
Mark Ronson – assistant producer (tracks 4, 9, 16), production (track 17)
Justin Tranter – songwriting (track 4)
Edgar J. Sandoval – violin (track 4)
DJ Dahi – assistant producer (track 4)
Josh Tillman – drums (track 4)
Logan McQuade – bass (tracks 5, 17, 18)
Antoine Fadavi – drums (tracks 5, 11, 18)
Romy Croft – songwriting (track 6)
Aron Noah Forbes – songwriting (track 7)
Tim Anderson – production (track 7), songwriting (tracks 7, 18), programming (track 7)
Tobias Jesso Jr. – background vocals (track 8)
Teo Halm – production (track 8), songwriting (track 8), piano (track 8)
Kid Harpoon – production (track 13), songwriting (track 13), assistant producer (track 13), drums (track 13), programming (track 13), synthesizer (track 13)
Martha Betty Glenn Brown – songwriting (track 16)
Banoffee – background vocals (track 16)
Melody Ector – synthesizer (tracks 17, 18)
Shawn Everett – production (track 18)

Technical

Emily Lazar – mastering engineer (all tracks)
Mike Malchicoff – recording engineer (tracks 1–7, 9, 1–12, 14, 15, 16), mixing engineer (tracks 2, 5, 6, 8, 10, 11, 14–18)
Oliver Straus – recording engineer (tracks 1, 7)
Rob Kinelski – mixing engineer (tracks 1, 12)
Casey Cuayo – assistant engineer (tracks 1, 12)
Mark "Spike" Stent – mixing engineer (tracks 3, 4, 7, 9, 13)
Todd Monfalcone – recording engineer (track 4), assistant engineer (track 15, 17)
Teo Halm – recording engineer (track 8)
Kid Harpoon – recording engineer (track 13)
Samuel Witte – engineer (track 13)
Chris Allgood – assistant engineer (tracks 14–18)
Riccardo Damian – recording engineer (track 17)
Ivan Wayman – recording engineer (track 18)
Shawn Everett – recording engineer (track 18)

Charts

References

2019 debut albums
King Princess albums
Albums produced by Mark Ronson
Albums produced by Shawn Everett
LGBT-related albums
Indie rock albums by American artists
Folk rock albums by American artists
Trip hop albums by American artists
Lo-fi music albums
Contemporary R&B albums by American artists